Laetitia Meignan (born 25 June 1960 in Paris) is a retired judoka from France, who represented her native country at the 1992 Summer Olympics in Barcelona, Spain. There she won the bronze medal in the women's half-heavyweight division (– 72 kg), alongside Irene de Kok from the Netherlands.

References

External links
 

1960 births
Living people
French female judoka
Judoka at the 1992 Summer Olympics
Olympic judoka of France
Olympic bronze medalists for France
Sportspeople from Paris
Olympic medalists in judo
Medalists at the 1992 Summer Olympics
20th-century French women
21st-century French women